The Independent Practitioners Network (IPN) is an association of practitioners founded in 1994 working in the broad field of human development, especially counselling and the psychological therapies. It is based on a system of peer support and monitoring.

Membership of IPN is open to groups of practitioners. Individuals who have not yet joined a group are ‘participants’. They can be involved in the activities of IPN, but may not describe themselves as ‘members of IPN’.

Groups become members of the IPN by:

(a) having at least four IPN participants
(b) publishing a group code of ethics and
(c) linking to at least two other groups of IPN participants.

Practitioners may include counsellors, psychotherapists, teachers/educators, bodyworkers and others who work in a relational way with the clientele. IPN supports and encourages diversity, and so a group will typically encompass a number of different practices. Members of a group support, monitor and constructively challenge each other’s practice. They may do this in a variety of ways, providing sufficient challenge to enable them to "stand by" each practitioner in their group. The process by which this is accomplished is monitored in turn by each of the link groups.

Each member group and its two link groups may not form a closed triangle.

IPN offers a form of accreditation which differs from other institutional accrediting bodies, in that it does not monitor training organisations, but rather examines current practice and is founded in ongoing and regular face-to-face engagement with peers in a non-hierarchical framework. Individuals can describe themselves as being ‘accredited through the IPN process’.

Some practitioners may be members of other accrediting bodies, using the IPN process to ensure and maintain best practice.

Further reading
 Campbell,   S.  and  Grace, J. (2013) ‘A qualitative   study on the  rewards   and challenges of being  an   Independent Practitioners Network Participant’, Self & Society: An International Journal for Humanistic Psychology, 40(4): 31–9; 
 Heron, J. (1997) (1997) ‘A self-generating practitioner community’, In R. House and N. Totton (eds),  Implausible Professions: Arguments for Pluralism and Autonomy in Psychotherapy and Counselling (pp. 241–54). Ross-   on-Wye: PCCS Books (2nd edn, 2011, pp. 264–77)
 House, R. (1997a) ‘Participatory ethics in a self-generating practitioner community’, in R. House and N. Totton (eds), Implausible Professions (pp. 321–34). Ross-on-Wye: PCCS Books (2nd edn, 2011, pp. 349–62)
 House, R. (2004) ‘An unqualified good: The IPN as a path through and beyond professionalisation’, Self and Society, 32 (4):  14–22; DOI:  10.1080/03060497.2004.11083800 (reprinted in  R. House,  In,  Against  and  Beyond Therapy, PCCS Books, 2010, pp. 218–26)
 House, R. (2007) ‘The be-coming of a therapist: experiential learning, self-education and the personal/professional nexus’,  British Journal of Guidance and Counselling  35 (4): 427–40;  (reprinted in R. House, In, Against and Beyond Therapy, PCCS Books, 2010, pp. 7–19)
 House, R. and Postle, D. (2008) ‘Unconsciously generating inevitability? Workable accountability alternatives to the statutory regulation of the psychological therapies’, in I. Parker and S. Revelli (eds),  Psychoanalytic Practice and State Regulation (pp. 191–203). London: Karnac Books (reprinted in R. House, In, Against and Beyond Therapy, PCCS Books, 2010, pp. 208–17)
 House,   R.   and   Totton,   N.   (eds)   (2011)  Implausible   Professions:   Arguments   for   Pluralism   and   Autonomy   in Psychotherapy and Counselling, 2nd edn, PCCS Books, Ross-on-Wye (first edn, 1997)
 House,  R., Maidman,   J.   and Scurfield,  L. (2013)   ‘Nick Totton  and   the  UK Independent   Practitioners’ Network’, Psychotherapy and Politics International, 11 (1): 18–25; 
 Totton, N. (1994) Letter to the editor. Self and Society 21 (6): 47
 Totton, N. (1995a) ‘The Independent Therapists Network Founding Conference: A personal view’, Self and Society, 22(6): 32–3; 
 Totton,   N.   (1995b)   ‘The   Independent   Therapists’   Network’,  Self   and   Society,   23   (3):   31–3;   
 Totton, N. (1997a) ‘The Independent Practitioners Network: a new model of accountability’, in R. House and N. Totton (eds), Implausible Professions: Arguments for Pluralism and Autonomy in Psychotherapy and Counselling (pp. 287–93). Ross-on-Wye: PCCS Books (2nd edn, 2011, pp. 315–22)
 Totton, N. (1997b) ‘Learning by  mistake:  client–practitioner conflict in  a  self-regulated network’, in  R.  House & N.Totton (eds), Implausible Professions (pp. 315–20). Ross-on-Wye: PCCS Books (2nd edn, 2011, pp. 342–8)

External links
 Official website

Psychology-related professional associations
Psychology organisations based in the United Kingdom